McKendree may refer to:

People with the surname
Kevin McKendree (born 1969), American blues musician and songwriter
William McKendree (1757–1835), American Methodist bishop
William McKendree Gwin (1805–1885), American politician
George McKendree Steele (1823-1901), American Methodist educator
William McKendree Robbins (1828–1905), American politician
Edward McKendree Bounds (1835–1913), American clergyman
William McKendree Springer (1836–1903), American politician
William McKendree Snyder (1848-1930), American painter
William McKendree Morgan (1869-1942), American lawyer
John McKendree Springer (1873–1963), American Methodist bishop

Places
McKendree Township, Vermilion County, Illinois
McKendree, Ohio
McKendree, West Virginia

Other uses
McKendree Elementary School, an elementary school in Lawrenceville, Georgia
McKendree University, a Methodist university in Lebanon, Illinois, US
McKendree United Methodist Church, a United Methodist church in Nashville, Tennessee
McKendree Chapel, a church in Jackson, Missouri

See also
McKendree Spring, an American musical band
McKendree cylinder